Ellis Ellwood Patterson (November 28, 1897 – August 25, 1985) was a one-term Democratic California congressman. Born in Yuba City, California, he served as representative between 1945 and 1947. Patterson also served in the California State Assembly. He was also the 33rd Lieutenant Governor of California, 1939-43.

Early life and career 
Born in Yuba City, California, Patterson attended public schools and graduated from the University of California, Berkeley in 1921. He served as a seaman in the United States Navy in 1917 and 1918 during World War I, and taught school in Colusa County, California from 1922 to 1924.

From 1923 to 1932, Patterson served as the district superintendent of schools for South Monterey County, California. He also studied law at Stanford University and the University of California from 1931 to 1936. He was admitted to the bar in 1937 and commenced law practice in Sacramento and Los Angeles.

Political career 
Patterson served as a member of the California State Assembly for the 35th district from 1931 to 1939. In 1936, after being defeated in the primaries in his second re-election bid, Patterson waged a write-in campaign and won the election.  Originally elected as a Republican, Patterson switched his party affiliation to Democrat after becoming enamored with President Franklin D. Roosevelt's New Deal.

After gaining publicity for his write-in Assembly campaign, Patterson was elected Lieutenant Governor of California, and served from 1938 to 1942. He was defeated in 1942. He was elected as a Democrat to the 79th United States Congress in 1944. In 1946, he did not seek renomination for his House seat, but instead was an unsuccessful candidate for nomination for the United States Senate. Patterson was an unsuccessful candidate for election to the 81st United States Congress in 1948, and resumed the practice of law.

Later career and death 
He was a resident of Los Angeles until his death there, of cancer, on August 25, 1985.

References

External links
Congressional biography

1897 births
1985 deaths
Members of the California State Assembly
Members of the United States House of Representatives from California
Lieutenant Governors of California
California Republicans
Deaths from cancer in California
20th-century American politicians
Democratic Party members of the United States House of Representatives from California